Rock Precinct is located in Hardin County, Illinois, USA.  As of the 2020 census, there were 155 households and a population of 411.

Geography

References

Precincts in Hardin County, Illinois